Distimake dissectus is a species of plant in the family Convolvulaceae and is native to North, Central, and South America.

References

dissecta
Flora of Argentina
Flora of Aruba
Flora of the Bahamas
Flora of Bolivia
Flora of the Cayman Islands
Flora of Colombia
Flora of Costa Rica
Flora of Cuba
Flora of the Dominican Republic
Flora of the Dutch Caribbean
Flora of El Salvador
Flora of Florida
Flora of French Guiana
Flora of Georgia (U.S. state)
Flora of Guatemala
Flora of Guyana
Flora of Haiti
Flora of Honduras
Flora of the Leeward Islands
Flora of Mexico
Flora of the Netherlands Antilles
Flora of Nicaragua
Flora of Panama
Flora of Paraguay
Flora of Puerto Rico
Flora of Suriname
Flora of Texas
Flora of Trinidad and Tobago
Flora of Uruguay
Flora of Venezuela
Flora of the Venezuelan Antilles
Flora without expected TNC conservation status